The Post Pop Depression Tour was a concert tour by American alternative artist Iggy Pop, launched in support of his namesake seventeenth studio album Post Pop Depression. The tour comprised two legs, with a total of 20 shows across Europe and North America, where he performed with the band used on the record. The first show of the tour was held at the Paramount Theatre in Seattle on 28 March 2016.

Jon Parales of The New York Times described the Austin, Texas performance as "He sang with full-throated conviction, utterly hard-nosed within the songs but grinning and thankful between them. He struck poses with every muscle clenched, he jittered across the stage, he repeatedly kicked around his microphone stand and a stool he barely used."

The London performance was streamed on its four-year anniversary.

Tour dates

References 

2016 concert tours
Iggy Pop concert tours